Guda Balotan is a village in Ahore tehsil of Jalore District of Rajasthan state in India. It is situated on Jalore-Sanderao road (SH-16). Jawai River separates Guda Balotan and Thanwala.

The nearest railway stations are Jalore and Falna. Ahore is within 30 minutes' travel, and Gangavas 2 km away.

Demographics
The population of Guda Balotan was 4,781 according to the 2001 census: 2,418 males and 2,363 females.

References

 Guda Balotan Population

Villages in Jalore district